The Kushk (known in Turkmenistan as Guşgy) is a river which, for a portion of its course, forms the boundary between Afghanistan and Turkmenistan, and used to form the southernmost border of the Russian Empire and the Soviet Union. The Kushk is fed by the Aq Robat and Galleh Chagar rivers in north-western Afghanistan. After 150 km, it flows into the Murghab River.

Etymology
It is also known as Kushka River. There it joins Egriyok River and then pours into Morghāb River. In the summer months, parts of the river are dry but in general the river irrigates farmland in the lower parts.

Geography
One bridge over the river was built in 1960, it carries a railroad track. Linking Toraghundi with Serhetabat. It later had a road bridge built as well. For about 16 km of its path, the Kushk river makes the border between Afghanistan and Turkmenistan. This river flows towards Northwest and after passing the town of Koshk-e Kohneh it joins Moqor river.

It was once also crossed by the Chahil Dukhteran Bridge (or 'Pul-i-Kishti'), now in ruins.

Ecological significance
The region of the Kushka River was home to the Persian leopard. In the past, the Caspian tiger and Asiatic cheetah had occurred here.

See also
 Badhyz State Nature Reserve
 Tejen River

References

Rivers of Afghanistan
Rivers of Turkmenistan
International rivers of Asia
Afghanistan–Turkmenistan border
Landforms of Herat Province
Border rivers